The Anglesey Sea Zoo is an aquarium and independent research and marine education centre on the south coast of Anglesey island in North Wales. Located just outside the village of Brynsiencyn, Anglesey Sea Zoo claims to be the largest aquarium in Wales and displays over 150 native species.

History
The Anglesey Sea Zoo was opened in 1983 when the owners of a lobster shop wholesale business realized lobster tanks had become attractions in themselves. In 2007 the attraction was sold to research ecologists who have since gone on to develop research and conservation projects based at the aquarium, as well as several community conservation initiatives.

Animals
The zoo hosts a conger eel, a shark pool, a kelp forest, and runs the Lobster Hatchery of Wales. the zoo currently has two species of sea horses—the short snouted seahorse found around the UK and Mediterranean, and the drab seahorse found in the Red Sea.

Conservation and Animal Rescue
The Anglesey Sea Zoo is a conservation zoo and tourist activity centre, involved in captive breeding programs and national and international consultancy. The zoo is one of the few places in the world that has been able to successfully breed and sustain native short-snouted seahorse. Started in 1995 when a stranded striped dolphin was successfully rescued, the zoo now contains a rescue center for sick or stranded marine animals, including dolphins, whales, porpoises, seals, turtles, and seabirds. The rescue center is part of a network being created in the British Isles by the British Divers Marine Life Rescue (BDMLR).

Eating and shopping
The aquarium also houses one of the only shops and bistros that sell almost exclusively fair trade and locally sourced products. Around 85% of the food served in the bistro, although simple, comes from within 10 miles of the centre. For the 2015–16 association football season the zoo were the away shirt sponsors for Welsh Premier League side Bangor City F.C.

References

External links 

Tourist attractions in Anglesey
Aquaria in the United Kingdom
1983 establishments in Wales
Rhosyr